The 2007 Swiss Open Super Series (officially known as the Wilson Badminton Swiss Open 2007 for sponsorship reasons) was a badminton tournament which took place at St. Jakobshalle in Basel, Switzerland, from 12 to 18 March 2007 and had a total purse of $200,000.

Tournament 
The 2007 Swiss Open Super Series was the fourth tournament of the 2007 BWF Super Series and also part of the Swiss Open championships, which had been held since 1955.

Venue 
This international tournament was held at St. Jakobshalle in Basel, Switzerland.

Point distribution 
Below is the point distribution for each phase of the tournament based on the BWF points system for the BWF Super Series event.

Prize money 
The total prize money for this tournament was US$200,000. Distribution of prize money was in accordance with BWF regulations.

Men's singles

Seeds 

 Lin Dan (semi-finals)
 Chen Jin (champion)
 Peter Gade (semi-finals)
 Lee Chong Wei (first round)
 Bao Chunlai (second round)
 Chen Yu (quarter-finals)
 Muhammad Hafiz Hashim (withdrew)
 Kenneth Jonassen (quarter-finals)

Finals

Top half

Section 1

Section 2

Bottom half

Section 3

Section 4

Women's singles

Seeds 

 Zhang Ning (champion)
 Wang Chen (first round)
 Xu Huaiwen (semi-finals)
 Zhu Lin (first round)
 Lu Lan (final)
 Petya Nedelcheva (first round)
 Pi Hongyan (quarter-finals)
 Yao Jie (quarter-finals)

Finals

Top half

Section 1

Section 2

Bottom half

Section 3

Section 4

Men's doubles

Seeds 

 Fu Haifeng / Cai Yun (quarter-finals)
 Jens Eriksen / Martin Lundgaard Hansen (final)
 Choong Tan Fook / Lee Wan Wah (first round)
 Jung Jae-sung / Lee Yong-dae (second round)
 Anthony Clark / Robert Blair (first round)
 Koo Kien Keat / Tan Boon Heong (champions)
 Lee Jae-jin / Hwang Ji-man (quarter-finals)
 Candra Wijaya /  Tony Gunawan (semi-finals)

Finals

Top half

Section 1

Section 2

Bottom half

Section 3

Section 4

Women's doubles

Seeds 

 Gao Ling / Huang Sui (withdrew)
 Zhang Yawen / Wei Yili (second round)
 Chien Yu-chin / Cheng Wen-hsing (semi-finals)
 Wong Pei Tty / Chin Eei Hui (withdrew)
 Gail Emms / Donna Kellogg (second round)
 Jiang Yanmei / Li Yujia (quarter-finals)
 Lee Kyung-won / Lee Hyo-jung (final)
 Zhao Tingting / Yang Wei (champions)

Finals

Top half

Section 1

Section 2

Bottom half

Section 3

Section 4

Mixed doubles

Seeds 

 Nova Widianto / Liliyana Natsir (withdrew)
 Xie Zhongbo / Zhang Yawen (quarter-finals)
 Nathan Robertson / Gail Emms (withdrew)
 Thomas Laybourn / Kamilla Rytter Juhl (withdrew)
 Anthony Clark / Donna Kellogg (first round)
 Robert Mateusiak / Nadieżda Kostiuczyk (semi-finals)
 Lee Yong-dae / Lee Hyo-jung (champions)
 Hendri Saputra / Li Yujia (quarter-finals)

Finals

Top half

Section 1

Section 2

Bottom half

Section 3

Section 4

References

External links 
Official website
Tournament Link

Swiss Open (badminton)
Open Super Series
Swiss Open